Man of Flowers is a 1983 Australian film about an eccentric, reclusive, middle-aged man, Charles Bremer, who enjoys the beauty of art, flowers, music and watching pretty women undress. Werner Herzog has a cameo role as Bremer's father in flashbacks. The film was directed by Paul Cox and was screened in the Un Certain Regard section at the 1984 Cannes Film Festival.

Plot
Charles Bremer (Norman Kaye) is a wealthy, reclusive man. He finds erotic satisfaction in the beauty of art, flowers, and a young woman (Alyson Best), who undresses for him. During the undressings he listens to operatic music such as Donizetti's Lucia di Lammermoor. Throughout the film, he reads letters he has sent to his mother. His mother had long since died, and the letters, it is later revealed, are addressed to himself.

Cast

Production
The idea for the film came out of a discussion between Paul Cox and Chris Haywood where they decided to make a low budget erotic film, along with Haywood's then-girlfriend Alyson Best. Bob Ellis was brought on to work on the script. (Ellis says he spent nine hours on it because Cox didn't want to spend any more time.) The movie was shot over three weeks.

Reception
The film was an art house hit around the world. It grossed $396,041 at the box office in Australia, which is equivalent to $1,045,548 in 2009 dollars.

Awards

See also
Cinema of Australia

References

External links
 
 Man of Flowers at Rotten Tomatoes
Man of Flowers at Oz Movies
 Man of Flowers at Allmovie
Article on Man of Flowers at Senses of Cinema 28 November 2009
Man of Flowers at New York Times

1983 films
1983 drama films
Films directed by Paul Cox
Films shot in Melbourne
Australian drama films
1980s English-language films